Summer Palace is the first full-length album by UK indie pop band Sunny Day Sets Fire. It was released in the US in 2008 by Iamsound, and in 2009 by UK label Wonderboat.

Track listing

2008 albums
Indie pop albums by British artists